Richard Day is an American writer, producer, director and occasional actor.  He has worked as a writer/producer for several television programs, including, Arrested Development, Spin City, Ellen, Roseanne, Mad About You and Aliens in America.

In addition to his work in television, he has also written and directed his own independent films Girls Will Be Girls and Straight-Jacket based on his own off-Broadway play.

References

External links 

 Rotten Tomatoes profile

American film directors
American male screenwriters
American television directors
American television producers
American television writers
Living people
Place of birth missing (living people)
Year of birth missing (living people)
American male television writers